Hazem Mohamed Abdel Hamid Emam (born 7 September 1988) is a retired Egyptian professional footballer who played as a right-back for Egyptian Premier League club Zamalek.

Club career
Emam played his entire career in Zamalek. He debuted in the first team in 2008 with manager Hossam Hassan. Emam also scored the game-winning goal against Smouha in the 2014 Egypt Cup Final. In 2014–15 season he became the team captain.

International career
Hazem Emam has represented the Egypt national football team, making his debut against Malawi on 29 December 2009. He was also on the team list for the Egyptian National Team in the 2014 FIFA World Cup qualification for Africa.

Honours
Zamalek
Egyptian Premier League: 2014–15, 2020–21, 2021-22

Egypt Cup: 2013, 2014, 2015, 2016, 2018, 2019 , 2021
Egyptian Super Cup: 2019–20
CAF Confederation Cup: 2018–19
CAF Super Cup: 2020
Saudi-Egyptian Super Cup: 2018

References

1988 births
Living people
Sportspeople from Giza
Egyptian footballers
Zamalek SC players
Egyptian Premier League players
Association football defenders 
Association football midfielders